Events from the year 2007 in Sweden

Incumbents
 Monarch – Carl XVI Gustaf
 Prime Minister – Fredrik Reinfeldt

Events

Date unknown
Bombadil Publishing, a youth-to-youth publishing house is founded.
Next House, a house construction company is founded.

Publications
 The Girl Who Kicked the Hornets' Nest, novel by Stieg Larsson.

Deaths

 27 March – Hans Hedberg, sculptor (born 1917)
 5 April – Maria Gripe, writer (born 1923)
 13 April – Birgitta Arman, actress (born 1921)
 5 November – Nils Liedholm, footballer (born 1922).

See also
 2007 in Swedish television

References

 
Years of the 21st century in Sweden
Sweden